Alexander City Commercial Historic District, in Alexander City, Alabama, is a historic district which was listed on the National Register of Historic Places in 2000.

The district includes portions of Broad, Main, Green, Alabama, and Jefferson Sts. and it includes Courthouse Square.  It includes 17 non-contributing buildings.

It includes Commercial block architecture.

Selected buildings included are:
City Hall (1974), 4 Court Square, designed in New Formalism style.
Tallapoosa County Courthouse/Old City Hall (1938), 82 Court Square, designed by Atlanta architects Robert and Company, Inc. An H-shaped brick building.

Masonic Lodge (c.1915), 115-123 Main, a three-story, two-part commercial block building; it once held the post office.
Graves Furniture Building (c.1930), 107 Main, a brick two-story, two-part commercial block; it has a flat parapet roof with
concrete dentil coping.  "Graves Furniture" no longer appears on front of building.

References

National Register of Historic Places in Tallapoosa County, Alabama
Historic districts on the National Register of Historic Places in Alabama
Buildings and structures completed in 1902